Morley Island is one of the Easter Group of the Houtman Abrolhos islands, off the coast of the Mid West region of Western Australia.

References

Easter Group